The Sanremo Music Festival 2020 was the 70th edition of the annual Sanremo Music Festival, a television song contest held in the Teatro Ariston of Sanremo and organised and broadcast by RAI. The show was held between 4 and 8 February 2020.

The show was presented by Amadeus, who also served as the artistic director for the competition.

Format
The 2020 edition of the Sanremo Music Festival took place at the Teatro Ariston in Sanremo, organized by the Italian public broadcaster RAI. The artistic director and the presenter for the competition was Amadeus.

Presenters
On 2 August 2019, RAI officially confirmed Amadeus as the presenter of the 70th edition of the Sanremo Music Festival. Together with Amadeus, ten co-hosts alternated during the five evenings: Laura Chimenti, Antonella Clerici, Emma D'Aquino, Rula Jebreal, Diletta Leotta, Francesca Sofia Novello, Georgina Rodríguez, Sabrina Salerno, Alketa Vejsiu and Mara Venier. Actress Monica Bellucci was set to participate as special guest, but she quit two weeks before the festival started.

Voting
Voting occurred through the combination of four methods:
 Public televoting, carried out via landline, mobile phone, the contest's official mobile app, and online voting.
 Jury of the Press Room, TV, Radio and Web.
 Demoscopic jury, composed by music fans who voted from their homes via an electronic voting system managed by Ipsos.
 Musicians and singers of the Sanremo Music Festival Orchestra.

Voting during the five evenings:
 First evening: Demoscopic jury.
 Second evening: Demoscopic jury.
 Third evening: Music and singers of the Sanremo Music Festival Orchestra.
 Fourth evening: Jury of the Press Room, TV, Radio and Web.
 Fifth evening. The voting systems will have the following weight: 34% Public televoting; 33% Jury of the Press Room, TV, Radio and Web; 33% Demoscopic Jury. At the end, a ranking of the songs/artists will be drawn up determined by the average of voting percentages obtained in all the evenings.

Selections

Newcomers' section
The artists competing in the Newcomers' section were selected through two separate contests: Sanremo Giovani and Area Sanremo.

Sanremo Giovani
On 23 October 2019, Rai Commission for Sanremo Music Festival 2020 announced a list of 842 acts, but only 65 artists coming from all Italian regions -excluding Basilicata and Valle d'Aosta- and from abroad were selected in the first phase.

On 3 November 2019, the jury of Sanremo Festival 2020 has selected the 20 semi-finalists. The selection was preceded by four afternoon shows on "Italia sì", conducted by Marco Liorni, where the artists and their entries were presented and were selected the 10 finalist.

On 19 December 2019, the ten finalists performed their songs at Sanremo Casino in Sanremo, with the show Sanremo Giovani 2019 broadcast on Rai 1 presented by Amadeus. The evening is divided into 5 duels, the five selected by the jury, televote, music commission and demoscopic jury were added to the two entries of Area Sanremo and Sanremo Young's winner, for a total of eight young emerging artists in the category of the Newcomers' section of the Sanremo Music Festival 2020. Leo Gassmann, Fadi, Marco Sentieri, Fasma and Eugenio in Via Di Gioia were chosen as contestants of the Newcomers' section of the Sanremo Music Festival 2020.

Area Sanremo
After the auditions, RAI Commission - composed by Massimo Cotto, Vittorio De Scalzi, Teresa De Sio, Andrea "Andy" Fumagalli and Petra Magoni; plus the participation of Gianni Testa - identified 8 finalists for the competition among the 750 acts:

 Alessia Geraldi
 Alex Leo
 Arianna Manca
 Camilla Magli
 Gabriella Martinelli & Lula
 Jacqueline Branciforte
 Matteo Faustini
 Messya

Newcomers' Finalists 

 Leo Gassmann - "Vai bene così" 
 Fadi - "Due noi" 
 Marco Sentieri - "Billy Blu"
 Fasma - "Per sentirmi vivo" 
 Eugenio in Via Di Gioia - "Tsunami"
 Matteo Faustini - "Nel bene e nel male"
 Gabriella Martinelli & Lula - "Il gigante d'acciaio"
 Tecla Insolia - "8 marzo"

Big section
The Big Artists section of the contest will see the participation of 24 artists. All the artists performed several times and were scored during the week, but every competing artist advanced to the final night.

Competing entries

Shows

First evening 
The first twelve Big Artists each performed their song and the first four Newcomers each performed their song for the first time in two manches, two for each one.

Big Artists

Newcomers

Second evening 
The other twelve Big Artists each performed their song and the other four Newcomers each performed their song for the first time.

Big Artists

Newcomers

Third evening - Sanremo 70 
All the twenty-four Big Artists each performed a song that are part of the history of the Sanremo Music Festival. In this case, the artists can choose whether or not to be accompanied by Italian or foreign guests.

Big Artist

Fourth evening 
All the twenty-four Big Artists each performed once again their songs. Also, the winner of the 4 remaining songs in the Newcomers section was determined.

During the evening, Bugo & Morgan were disqualified for failing to deliver their performance.

Big Artists

Newcomers

Fifth evening 
The 23 Big Artists each performed their entry for a final time. The top three then faced a superfinal vote, where the winner was decided.

Superfinal

Special guests
The special guests of Sanremo Music Festival 2020 were:

 Singers / musicians: Alessandra Amoroso, Albano, Biagio Antonacci, Bobby Solo, Coez, Dua Lipa, Elisa Toffoli, Emma Marrone, Fiorella Mannoia, Gente de Zona, Ghali, Gianna Nannini, Gigi D'Alessio, Giorgia, Kumalibre, Laura Pausini, Lewis Capaldi, Massimo Ranieri, Mika, Ricchi e Poveri, Roger Waters, Romina Power, Tiziano Ferro, Tony Renis, Vittorio Grigolo, Wilma De Angelis, Zucchero.
 Actors / comedians / directors / models: Alma Noce, Andrea Pittorino, Antonio Maggio, Christian De Sica, Claudio Santamaria, Cristiana Capotondi, Diego Abatantuono, Donatella Finocchiaro, Edoardo Pesce, Francesco Centorame, Gabriele Muccino, Gaia Gerace, Gessica Notaro, Kim Rossi Stuart, Margherita Mazzucco, Massimo Ghini, Micaela Ramazzotti, Paolo Rossi, Pierfrancesco Favino, Riccardo Morozzi, Roberto Benigni, Rosario Fiorello.
 Other persons or notable figures: Carlotta Mantovan, Costantino della Gherardesca, Cristiano Ronaldo, Dayane Mello, Max Giusti, Novak Djokovic, Nicola Savino, Paolo Palumbo, Vincenzo Mollica.

Broadcast and ratings

Local broadcast 
Rai 1 and Rai Radio 2 carried the official broadcasts of the festival in Italy. The five evenings were also streamed online via the broadcaster's official website RaiPlay.

Ratings Sanremo Music Festival 2020
The audience is referred to that of Rai 1.

International broadcast
The international television service Rai Italia broadcast the competition in the Americas, Africa, Asia, Australia and Europe. The contest was also streamed via the official Eurovision Song Contest website eurovision.tv.  Omni Television broadcast all five shows in Canada on a delay from February 10 to the 14th. RTSH, TVR and RTCG also broadcast Sanremo 2020.

Notes

References

2020 in Italian television
2020 song contests
February 2020 events in Italy
Sanremo Music Festival by year